The Yoshimoto Cube is a polyhedral mechanical puzzle toy invented  in 1971 by , who discovered that two stellated rhombic dodecahedra could be pieced together into a cube when he was finding different ways he could split a cube equally in half. Yoshimoto first introduced his cube in 1972 at a solo exhibition entitled "From Cube to Space", and later developed three commercial versions. In 1982, Yoshimoto Cube No. 1 was included in the Museum of Modern Art's permanent collection.

The cube is made up of eight interconnected cubes which can be folded or unfolded indefinitely. The unfolded cube can be dissected and reassembled into two stellated rhombic dodecahedra, each of which comprise half the volume of the original cube, making it a kind of three-dimensional dissection puzzle.

See also
 Rubik's Cube
 n-dimensional sequential move puzzles

References

External links
 Geometric Toys
 

Mechanical puzzle cubes
Educational toys